Lichtsteiner is a Swiss surname. Notable people with the surname include

 Alois Lichtsteiner (born 1950), Swiss painter
 Markus Lichtsteiner (born 1973), Swiss footballer
 Stephan Lichtsteiner (born 1984), Swiss footballer

Surnames of Swiss origin